Hec Ramsey is an American television series that aired on NBC from 1972 to 1974, starring Richard Boone. The series was created by Jack Webb's production company, Mark VII Limited in association with Universal's television productions. The series was first broadcast in the United States by NBC as part of the NBC Mystery Movie, a wheel series format.

Cast

Main
Richard Boone as Hec Ramsey
Rick Lenz as Chief Oliver Stamp
Harry Morgan as Doc Amos Coogan

Recurring
Perry Lopez as Sergeant Juan Mendoza
Dennis Rucker as Constable Arne Tornquist
Bill Vint as Constable Davey Watson

Premise
Richard Boone portrayed Hector "Hec" Ramsey, a former gunfighter turned lawman, with a keen interest in the emerging field of forensics. Hec replaced his "gunfighter" rig with a cut-down Colt revolver - "Faster draw, good at short range. Use a rifle for long" that echoed modern detectives' guns - but his most important tools included fingerprinting equipment and magnifying lenses, which enabled him to determine the perpetrators of crimes with greater accuracy.  Ramsey had served as a Deputy United States Marshal in the Oklahoma Indian Territory under the supervision of Judge Isaac Parker, Judge of the United States District Court for the Western District of Arkansas, which had jurisdiction for the Indian Territory.

The series follows Ramsey after he accepts the position of deputy police chief in the fictional town of New Prospect, Oklahoma.
In the series' pilot, "The Century Turns", set in 1901, Hec meets New Prospect's chief of police, Oliver B. Stamp (Rick Lenz), a young, inexperienced lawman who needs help and after some initial friction, the two men develop a working relationship. They are frequently accompanied by a colorful local doctor, Amos Coogan, who is also the local Coroner/Medical Examiner (played by frequent Webb performer Harry Morgan, who was also a regular on The Richard Boone Show). All of them went on to appear in "The Shootist" with John Wayne.

Production
The series was one of the first television Westerns set in the early 20th century, at a time when viewer interest in the old West was waning. Two contemporary series with a similar setting were Nichols, starring James Garner and Bearcats! starring Rod Taylor and Dennis Cole; the latter was set in 1914.

Producer Jack Webb described Hec Ramsey as "Dragnet meets John Wayne" and critics picked up on that. The scripts balanced authentic "modern" investigative methods of the 1900s with action and adventure.

Despite good ratings, the series was canceled after two seasons, following disagreements between Boone and Universal. Douglas Benton and creator Harold Jack Bloom were the producers; Jack Webb was executive producer.

Among the guest stars in the series' 10 episodes, were: Claude Akins, Rory Calhoun, Jackie Cooper (in "Dead Heat"), Angie Dickinson, Steve Forrest, Kim Hunter, Rita Moreno, Sheree North, Ruth Roman, Kurt Russell (in "Scar Tissue"), Stuart Whitman (in "A Hard Road to Vengeance") and Marie Windsor (in "Mystery of the Green Feather").

Episodes

Season 1 (1972–73)

Season 2 (1973–74)

References

Brooks, Tim and Marsh, Earle, The Complete Directory to Prime Time Network and Cable TV Shows

External links

NBC original programming
1972 American television series debuts
1974 American television series endings
Television series set in the 1900s
1970s Western (genre) television series
NBC Mystery Movie
Television series by Mark VII Limited
Television series by Universal Television
Ramsey, Hec
English-language television shows
American detective television series
Television shows set in Oklahoma